COX18, cytochrome c oxidase assembly factor is a protein that in humans is encoded by the COX18 gene.

Function

This gene encodes a cytochrome c oxidase assembly protein. The encoded protein is essential for integral membrane protein insertion into the mitochondrial inner membrane. It is also required for cytochrome c oxidase assembly and activity. Alternative splicing results in multiple transcript variants. [provided by RefSeq, Jul 2014].

References

Further reading